Judith and her Maidservant may refer to:
Judith and her Maidservant (Gentileschi, Florence)
Judith and her Maidservant (Gentileschi, Cannes)
Judith and her Maidservant (Gentileschi, Naples)
Judith and Her Maidservant (Detroit)